H. Donald Stewart (born 1939) is an American politician who served in the New Jersey General Assembly from 1972 to 1982.

References

1939 births
Living people
Democratic Party members of the New Jersey General Assembly
Politicians from Woodbury, New Jersey